The Men's freestyle 74 kg wrestling competitions at the 2022 Commonwealth Games in Birmingham, England took place on 6 August at the Coventry Arena. A total of 15 competitors from 15 nations took part.

Shanith Chathuranga, a wrestler from Sri Lanka was scheduled to compete in the event, left the athletes village, and was believed to have fled.

Results
The draw is as follows:

Repechage

References

External link
 Results
 

Wrestling at the 2022 Commonwealth Games